Charles Okun (September 8, 1924 - July 3, 2005) was an American assistant director, producer and production manager. He was nominated for an Academy Award in the category Best Picture for the film The Accidental Tourist. Okun died in July 2005 from complications of cancer in Florida, at the age of 80.

Selected filmography 
 The Accidental Tourist (1988; co-nominated with Lawrence Kasdan and Michael Grillo)

References

External links 

1924 births
2005 deaths
People from New York (state)
Film producers from New York (state)
American film producers
Deaths from cancer in Florida
Unit production managers